Georges Rossignon (23 April 1900 – date of death unknown) was a French boxer who competed in the 1924 Summer Olympics.

In 1924 he was eliminated in the quarter-finals of the light heavyweight class after losing his fight to the upcoming gold medalist Harry Mitchell.

References

External links

1900 births
Year of death missing
Light-heavyweight boxers
Olympic boxers of France
Boxers at the 1924 Summer Olympics
French male boxers